Anthony La Touche Kirwan was an Irish Anglican priest.

He was born into an ecclesiastical family, the son of the Walter Blake Kirwan, Dean of Killala from 1800 to 1805  and educated at Trinity College, Dublin.

He was Dean of Kilmacduagh from 1839 to 1849; and then of Limerick from then until his death on  13 July 1868.

He married Susan, the daughter of William Blacker, of Woodbrook, Wexford. Two of their daughters married Thomas William Anderson of Gracedieu, Co. Waterford.

Notes

Alumni of Trinity College Dublin
Deans of Kilmacduagh
Deans of Limerick
1868 deaths
Year of birth missing